Pieds paquets or pied et paquets (literally, feet packet or feet and packages in French) is a local dish and culinary specialty of Marseille and Sisteron but also commonly found in much of Southeastern France. It consists of sheep's feet and stuffed sheep's tripe stewed together.

Preparation

Writing in 1958, Waverley Root observed that although the packages used to be cooked with calves' feet, that was no longer the case except in Nice, where the dish was called tripes à la niçoise. If using sheep's feet, the hair on them is seared off, then the feet are placed in the bottom of the pot in which the packages will be stewed.

To make the packages, sheep's tripe is cleaned and cut into four to eight squares. Each piece is stuffed with onions, parsley, garlic, and salt pork before being rolled and wrapped into a small pouch or package. The stuffed offal is then stewed for several hours in a white wine and tomato sauce.

The feet and stuffed offal can also be cooked without tomato sauce, in which case it is eaten with a vinaigrette and known as tripo à la reboulado.

See also

 List of lamb dishes

References

External links
 

Cuisine of Provence